Haiduceşti may refer to:

A village in commune Vidra, Alba
A type of doina (Romanian ballad)